Dibrell is a surname. Notable people with this surname include:
George Gibbs Dibrell (1822–1888), American lawyer and legislator in Tennessee; general in the Confederate States Army
Joseph Burton Dibrell Jr. (1855–1934), American lawyer and judge in Texas
Tony Dibrell (born 1995), American professional baseball player

See also 
 Burkhart-Dibrell House, a historic house in Ketchikan, Alaska
 Djibril Cissé (born 1981), French footballer
 Dibrell Smutny, fictional character in Fargo (season 4)
 Dib Williams (born Edwin Dibrell Williams; 1910–1992), American professional baseball player
 George D. Young III (born George Dibrell Young III in 1955), bishop of the Episcopal Diocese of East Tennessee